The 2016 Galway Senior Hurling Championship was the 119th staging of the Galway Senior Hurling Championship since its establishment in 1887. Sarsfields were the reigning champions. Abbeyknockmoy and Moycullen participated in the senior championship having been promoted from the intermediate competition in 2015.

Fixtures and results

Group stage
The Senior A and Senior B Group stage draw was made on 8 March 2016 broadcast live on Galway Bay FM.

Senior A
Senior A consists of 12 teams divided into two groups of 6. The top 2 teams from each group will automatically qualify for the quarter finals. The 3rd and 4th teams from each group will play in preliminary quarter finals. The bottom two teams from each group will cross play with the losers playing in the Senior B competition in 2017.

Senior A - Group 1
{| class="wikitable" 
!width=20|
!width=150 style="text-align:left;"|Team
!width=20|
!width=20|
!width=20|
!width=20|
!width=30|
!width=30|
!width=20|
!width=20|
|-style="background:#98FB98;"
|1||align=left| Loughrea ||5||4||0||1||5-86||3-77||15||8
|-style="background:#98FB98;"
|2||align=left| Gort ||5||3||1||1||9-76||4-85||6||7
|-style="background:#CCCCFF;"
|3||align=left| Sarsfields ||5||2||1||2||3-80||3-79||1||5
|-style="background:#CCCCFF;"
|4||align=left| St. Thomas' ||5||2||0||3||5-81||6-70||8||4
|-
|5||align=left| Castlegar ||5||2||0||3||9-79||9-81||-1||4
|-
|6||align=left| Turloughmore ||5||0||2||3||0-71||6-81||6||2
|}

Senior A - Group 2
{| class="wikitable" 
!width=20|
!width=150 style="text-align:left;"|Team
!width=20|
!width=20|
!width=20|
!width=20|
!width=30|
!width=35|
!width=20|
!width=20|
|-style="background:#98FB98;"
|1||align=left| Portumna ||5||4||1||0||6-85||3-75||19||9
|-style="background:#98FB98;"
|2||align=left| Craughwell ||5||4||0||1||8-84||4-72||24||8
|-style="background:#CCCCFF;"
|3||align=left| Cappataggle ||5||2||1||2||8-80||6-71||15||5
|-style="background:#CCCCFF;"
|4||align=left| Padraig Pearses ||5||2||0||3||7-72||5-88||-10||4
|- 
|5||align=left| Ardrahan ||5||1||0||4||3-70||11-82||-36||2
|-
|6||align=left| Liam Mellows ||5||1||0||4||7-72||10-75||-12||2
|}

Senior A - Relegation

Senior B
Senior B consists of 12 teams divided into two groups of 6. The top teams from each group will qualify for preliminary quarter finals and play in the Senior A competition in 2017. The four 2nd and 3rd placed teams will cross play with the winners also qualifying for preliminary quarter finals.

Senior B - Group 1
{| class="wikitable" 
!width=20|
!width=150 style="text-align:left;"|Team
!width=20|
!width=20|
!width=20|
!width=20|
!width=30|
!width=30|
!width=20|
!width=20|
|-style="background:#98FB98;"
|1||align=left| Tommy Larkin's ||5||5||0||0||4-81||2-55||32||10
|-style="background:#CCCCFF;"
|2||align=left| Abbeyknockmoy ||5||3||0||2||5-82||5-71||11||6
|-style="background:#CCCCFF;"
|3||align=left| Beagh ||5||2||1||2||8-70||4-62||20||5
|-
|4||align=left| Killimordaly ||5||2||1||2||7-80||7-75||5||5
|-
|5||align=left| Moycullen ||5||2||0||1||8-62||7-78||-13||4 
|-
|6||align=left| Kiltormer ||5||0||0||5||1-56||8-80||-55||0
|}

Senior B - Group 2
{| class="wikitable" 
!width=20|
!width=150 style="text-align:left;"|Team
!width=20|
!width=20|
!width=20|
!width=20|
!width=30|
!width=30|
!width=20|
!width=20|
|-style="background:#98FB98;"
|1||align=left| Mullagh ||5||3||2||0||4-80||2-72||14||8
|-style="background:#CCCCFF;"
|2||align=left| Tynagh-Abbey/Duniry ||5||4||0||1||9-83||3-57||44||8
|-style="background:#CCCCFF;"
|3||align=left| Kilnadeema-Leitrim ||5||3||1||1||6-88||5-72||19||7
|-
|4||align=left| Athenry ||5||2||0||3||6-79||3-79||9||4
|-
|5||align=left| Clarinbridge ||5||1||1||3||1-71||5-82||-23||3
|-
|6||align=left| Carnmore ||5||0||0||5||1-61||8-102||-62||0
|}

Senior B - Playoffs

Preliminary Quarter-finals

Quarter-finals

Semi-finals

Final

Relegation

References

Galway Senior Hurling Championship
Galway Senior Hurling Championship